Tina Jakovina (born August 11, 1992) is a Slovenian basketball player for Crvena zvezda and the Slovenian national team.

She participated at the EuroBasket Women 2017.

References

1992 births
Living people
People from Postojna
Slovenian expatriate basketball people in Italy
Slovenian expatriate basketball people in Serbia
Slovenian women's basketball players
ŽKK Crvena zvezda players
Small forwards